Yuriy Ilyich Burlakov; born 1960) is a former Soviet/Russian cross-country skier who competed from 1982 to 1997. He won two medals at the 1982 FIS Nordic World Ski Championships with a gold in the 4 × 10 km relay (Tied with Norway) and a silver in the 50 km.

Burlakov also finished 12th in the 30 km event in both the 1984 Winter Olympics and the 1988 Winter Olympics.

Cross-country skiing results
All results are sourced from the International Ski Federation (FIS).

Olympic Games

World Championships
 2 medals – (1 gold, 1 silver)

World Cup

Individual Podiums
4 podiums

Team Podiums
1 victory
1 podium

References

External links

1960 births
Living people
Cross-country skiers at the 1984 Winter Olympics
Cross-country skiers at the 1988 Winter Olympics
Soviet male cross-country skiers
FIS Nordic World Ski Championships medalists in cross-country skiing
Universiade medalists in cross-country skiing
Universiade silver medalists for the Soviet Union
Competitors at the 1981 Winter Universiade
Olympic cross-country skiers of the Soviet Union